Richard Gaspari (born May 16, 1963) is an American retired professional bodybuilder, and a former member of the IFBB. He came in second place at the 1986, 1987, and 1988 Mr. Olympia competitions.

Gaspari grew up in Edison, New Jersey; as a teenager he would sneak into Rutgers University weight room to take advantage of the exercise equipment. He became a professional bodybuilder in 1984, entered the 1985 IFBB Night of Champions and placed 2nd, then placed 3rd for his first participation at Mr. Olympia that same year. Richard was a three-time runner-up at the Mr. Olympia contest (the most important in the professional circuit) during the long reign of Lee Haney at the top. He also won several secondary IFBB Grand Prix competitions during the same period. He was particularly praised for his hitherto-unseen level of conditioning and definition, being the first athlete to exhibit striations on the gluteal muscles.

Richard Gaspari was inducted into the IFBB Hall of Fame in 2004. In 2011, he was awarded with the Muscle Beach Hall of Fame Award. He was featured on the cover of the October, 2011 issue of Iron Man, 23 years after he last appeared on the cover of the magazine. In 2013 he was presented with the Arnold Classic Lifetime Achievement Award.

In 1997, Gaspari started his own supplement company, Gaspari Nutrition. In 2005, the company became the subject of controversy after a client’s investigation implicated Gaspari Nutrition in a ring of supplement companies engaged in covertly spiking some of their products with a variety of steroids and/or their derivatives while deceptively mislabeling their ingredients, FDA violations which resulted in a lawsuit upheld in 2017. Shortly after, Gaspari filed for bankruptcy and sold the company. 

Gaspari resides in Toms River, New Jersey.

Competition history
 1983 NPC Junior Nationals Overall Winner
 1983 NPC Junior Nationals HeavyWeight, 1st
 1983 NPC Nationals HeavyWeight, 5th
 1984 NPC Nationals Light-HeavyWeight, 1st
 1984 World IFBB Amateur Championships Light-HeavyWeight, 1st
 1985 IFBB Night of Champions 2nd
 1985 IFBB Mr. Olympia 3rd
 1986 IFBB Los Angeles Pro Championships Winner
 1986 IFBB Mr. Olympia 2nd
 1986 IFBB World Pro Championships Winner
 1987 IFBB Grand Prix France Winner
 1987 IFBB Grand Prix Germany 2nd
 1987 IFBB Grand Prix Germany (2) Winner
 1987 IFBB Mr. Olympia 2nd
 1988 IFBB Grand Prix England 2nd
 1988 IFBB Grand Prix France Winner
 1988 IFBB Grand Prix Germany Winner
 1988 IFBB Grand Prix Greece 2nd
 1988 IFBB Grand Prix Italy Winner
 1988 IFBB Grand Prix Spain (2) 2nd
 1988 IFBB Grand Prix Spain Winner
 1988 IFBB Mr. Olympia 2nd
 1989 IFBB Arnold Classic Winner
 1989 IFBB Mr. Olympia 4th
 1990 IFBB Mr. Olympia 5th
 1991 IFBB Arnold Classic 7th
 1991 IFBB Mr. Olympia 10th
 1992 IFBB Arnold Classic 13th
 1994 IFBB Chicago Pro Invitational 16th
 1994 IFBB Niagara Falls Pro Invitational 15th
 1994 IFBB Night of Champions - Did not place
 1995 IFBB Canada Pro Cup 5th
 1995 IFBB Night of Champions 12th
 1996 IFBB Canada Pro Cup 11th
 1996 IFBB Florida Pro Invitational 12th
 1996 IFBB San Jose Pro Invitational 16th

References

External links
 Official Website
 Muscle Memory
 Rich Gaspari Profile
 Rich Gaspari photos
 Rich Gaspari Interview evolutionofbodybuilding.net

Living people
American bodybuilders
Professional bodybuilders
People from Edison, New Jersey
Sportspeople from Jackson Township, New Jersey
1963 births